Japan competed at the 1996 Summer Olympics in Atlanta, United States. 306 competitors, 157 men and 149 women, took part in 168 events in 27 sports.

Medalists

| width="78%" align="left" valign="top" |

| width=22% align=left valign=top |

Archery

In the nation's sixth Olympic archery competition, three of Japan's five archers won their first matches.  All three lost in the second round, however.

Women's Individual Competition:
 Kinue Kodama → Round of 32, 24th place (1-1)
 Ai Ouchi → Round of 64, 41st place (0-1)
 Misato Koide → Round of 64, 56th place (0-1)

Men's Individual Competition:
 Hiroshi Yamamoto → Round of 32, 19th place (1-1)
 Takayoshi Matsushita → Round of 32, 27th place (1-1)

Women's Team Competition:
 Kodama, Ouchi, and Koide → Round of 16, 14th place (0-1)

Athletics

Men's 100 metres
Nobuharu Asahara
Hiroyasu Tsuchie

Men's 200 metres
Koji Ito
Takahiro Mazuka

Men's 400 metres
Shigekazu Omori

Men's 10,000 metres
Toshinari Takaoka
Katsuhiko Hanada

Men's 4 × 100 metres Relay
Nobuharu Asahara
Hiroyasu Tsuchie
Koji Ito
Satoru Inoue

Men's 4 × 400 metres Relay
Shunji Karube, Koji Ito, Jun Osakada, and Shigekazu Omori
 Heat — 3:02.82
 Semi Final — 3:01.92
 Final — 3:00.76 (→ 5th place)

Men's 400m Hurdles
Shunji Karube
 Heat — 48.96s (→ did not advance)

Hideaki Kawamura
 Heat — 49.88s (→ did not advance)

Kazuhiko Yamazaki
 Heat — 49.07s (→ did not advance)

Men's Marathon
 Hiromi Taniguchi — 2:17.26 (→ 19th place)
 Masaki Oya — 2:22.13 (→ 54th place)
 Kenjiro Jitsui — 2:33.27 (→ 93rd place)

Men's 20 km Walk
Daisuke Ikeshima — 1:24.54 (→ 22nd place)

Men's 50 km Walk
Tadahiro Kosaka — 4:05.57 (→ 29th place)

Men's High Jump
Tomohiro Nomura

Men's Long Jump
 Nobuharu Asahara
 Qualification — 7.46m (→ did not advance)

Men's Pole Vault
Teruyasu Yonekura

Women's 5,000 metres 
 Michiko Shimizu
 Harumi Hiroyama
 Yoshiko Ichikawa

Women's 10,000 metres 
 Masako Chiba
 Qualification — 31:37.03
 Final — 31:20.62 (→ 5th place)

 Yuko Kawakami
 Qualification — 32:31.69
 Final — 31:23.23 (→ 7th place)

 Hiromi Suzuki
 Qualification — 31:54.89
 Final — 32:43.39 (→ 16th place)

Women's Marathon
 Yuko Arimori — 2:28.39 (→  Bronze Medal)
 Izumi Maki — 2:32.35 (→ 12th place)
 Junko Asari — 2:34.31 (→ 17th place)

Women's 100 metres Hurdles
Yvonne Kanazawa

Women's 10 km Walk
 Yuka Mitsumori — dsq (→ no ranking)

Women's Javelin Throw
 Akiko Miyajima
 Qualification — 53.98m (→ did not advance)

Badminton

Baseball

Defending bronze medalist Japan competed for the second time in the Olympic baseball tournament.  They got off to a rough start, losing three of their first four games to Australia, Cuba, and the United States.  After winning their next three, however, the Japanese were in a tie with the Nicaraguans for third and fourth places.  Since Japan had beaten Nicaragua in head-to-head competition, they won the tie-breaker and faced the United States in the semifinals rather than the Cubans, which had not lost any of their 16 games in the 1992 and 1996 Olympiads.  Japan defeated the United States to advance to the final, where they became the Cubans' 18th victim (Nicaragua's loss in the semifinals being the 17th win for Cuba).

Men's Team Competition:
 Japan - Silver Medal (5-4)

Basketball

Women's tournament

Preliminary round

Quarterfinals

Classification Round 5th−8th place

7th place game

Beach volleyball

Shoji Setoyama and Kazuyuki Takao — 17th place overall

Boxing

Men's Flyweight (– 51 kg)
Kazumasa Tsujimoto
 First Round — Lost to Lernik Papyan (Armenia), 5-10

Men's Light Welterweight (– 63,5 kg)
Fumitaka Nitami
 First Round — Lost to Eduard Zakharov (Russia), 6-21

Men's Middleweight (– 75 kg)
Hirokuni Moto
 First Round — Defeated Tao Chen (China), 15-10 
 First Round — Lost to Tomasz Borowski (Poland), 6-11

Canoeing

Cycling

Track Competition
Men's Points Race
 Masahiro Yasuhara
 Final — 2 points (→ 15th place)

Mountain Bike
Men's Cross Country
 Kyoshi Miura
 Final — 2:45:03 (→ 26th place)

Women's Cross Country
 Kanako Tanikawa
 Final — 2:05.44 (→ 23rd place)

Diving

Women's 3m Springboard
Yuki Motobuchi
 Preliminary Heat — 262.71
 Semi Final — 210.00
 Final — 296.04 (→ 6th place)

Equestrianism

Fencing

Four fencers, one man and three women, represented Japan in 1996.

Men's foil
 Hiroki Ichigatani

Women's épée
 Noriko Kubo
 Yuko Arai
 Nanae Tanaka

Women's team épée
 Nanae Tanaka, Noriko Kubo, Yuko Arai

Football

Men's competition

Women's competition

Gymnastics

Judo

Rhythmic gymnastics

Rowing

Sailing

Shooting

Softball

Women's Team Competition
Preliminary Round Robin
Defeated Netherlands (3:0)
Defeated PR China (3:0)
Lost to United States (1:6)
Defeated Canada (4:0)
Lost to Australia (0:10)
Defeated Puerto Rico (8:1)
Defeated Chinese Taipei (5:1)
Semifinals
Lost to Australia (0:3)
Bronze Medal Match
 Did not advance → 4th place

Team roster
Juri Takayama
Noriko Yamaji
Haruka Saito
Misako Ando
Naomi Matsumoto
Yoshiko Fujimoto
Ikuko Fukita
Noriko Harada
Mayumi Inoue
Chika Kodama
Kyoko Kobayashi
Kyoko Mochida
Emi Tsukada
Masako Watanabe
Tomoko Watanabe
Head coach: Mitsutoshi Suzumura

Swimming

Men's 50 metres Freestyle:
 Yukihiro Matsushita
 Heat — 23.60 (→ did not advance, 35th place)

Men's 100 metres Freestyle:
 Shunsuke Ito
 Heat — 51.29 (→ did not advance, 37th place)

Men's 200 metres Freestyle:
 Shunsuke Ito
 Heat — 1:51.97 (→ did not advance, 23rd place)

Men's 400 metres Freestyle:
 Hisato Yasui
 Heat — 4:00.19 (→ did not advance, 24th place)

Men's 1500 m Freestyle
 Masato Hirano
 Heat — 15:19.48
 B-Final — 15:17.28 (→ 6th place)

 Hisato Yasui
 Heat — 15:43.66 (→ did not advance, 22nd place)

Men's 100 m Backstroke
 Keitaro Konnai
 Heat — 56.35
 B-Final — 55.74 (→ 9th place)

 Hajime Itoi
 Heat — 56.22
 B-Final — 56.23 (→ 11th place)

Men's 200 m Backstroke
 Hajime Itoi
 Heat — 2:00.43
 Final — 2:00.10 (→ 5th place)

 Ryuji Horii
 Heat — 2:02.33
 B-Final — 2:01.54 (→ 9th place)

Men's 100 m Breaststroke
 Akira Hayashi
 Heat — 1:02.63
 B-Final — 1:02.75 (→ 12th place)

 Yoshinobu Miyazaki
 Heat — 1:03.13 (→ did not advance, 22nd place)

Men's 200 m Breaststroke
 Akira Hayashi
 Heat — 2:15.37
 B-Final — 2:16.69 (→ 16th place)

Men's 100 m Butterfly
 Takashi Yamamoto
 Heat — 53.95
 B-Final — 53.98 (→ 13th place)

 Yukihiro Matsushita
 Heat — 54.50 (→ did not advance, 20th place)

Men's 200 m Butterfly
 Takashi Yamamoto
 Heat — 2:00.87 (→ did not advance, 20th place)

Men's 200 m Individual Medley
 Tatsuya Kinugasa
 Heat — 2:03.42
 B-Final — 2:04.59 (→ 14th place)

 Jo Yoshimi
 Heat — 2:04.49
 B-Final — 2:05.42 (→ 16th place)

Men's 400 m Individual Medley
 Toshiaki Kurasawa
 Heat — 4:24.83
 B-Final — 4:23.36 (→ 10th place)

 Tatsuya Kinugasa
 Heat — 4:26.73
 B-Final — 4:24.25 (→ 11th place)

Men's 4 × 100 m Medley Relay
 Keitaro Konnai, Akira Hayashi, Takashi Yamamoto and Shunsuke Ito
 Heat — 3:41.78 
 Final — 3:40.51 (→ 5th place)

Women's 50 m Freestyle
 Sumika Minamoto
 Heat — 25.89 
 B-Final — 26.05 (→ 12th place)

Women's 100 m Freestyle
 Sumika Minamoto
 Heat — 57.25 (→ did not advance, 25th place)

Women's 200 m Freestyle
 Suzu Chiba
 Heat — 2:01.11 
 B-Final — 2:01.00 (→ 10th place)

 Naoko Imoto
 Heat — 2:03.78 (→ did not advance, 20th place)

Women's 400 m Freestyle
 Eri Yamanoi
 Heat — 4:13.40 
 Final — 4:11.68 (→ 7th place)
                
 Suzu Chiba
 Heat — 4:16.07 
 B-Final — 4:16.60 (→ 13th place)

Women's 800 m Freestyle
 Eri Yamanoi
 Heat — 8:40.47 (→ did not advance, 10th place)

 Aiko Miyake
 Heat — 8:55.77 (→ did not advance, 21st place)

Women's 100 m Backstroke
 Mai Nakamura
 Heat — 1:02.35 
 Final — 1:02.33 (→ 4th place)

 Miki Nakao
 Heat — 1:02.90
 Final — 1:02.78 (→ 8th place)

Women's 200 m Backstroke
 Mai Nakamura
 Heat — 2:15.05 
 B-Final — 2:13.40 (→ 9th place)

 Miki Nakao
 Heat — 2:12.92
 Final — 2:13.57 (→ 5th place)

Women's 100 m Breaststroke
 Masami Tanaka
 Heat — 1:09.89 
 B-Final — 1:10.43 (→ 13th place)

 Kyoko Iwasaki
 Heat — 1:11.33 (→ did not advance, 22nd place)

Women's 200 m Breaststroke
 Masami Tanaka
 Heat — 2:29.36
 Final — 2:28.05 (→ 5th place)

 Kyoko Iwasaki
 Heat — 2:30.84
 B-Final — 2:29.32 (→ 10th place)

Women's 100 m Butterfly
 Hitomi Kashima
 Heat — 1:00.85
 Final — 1:00.11 (→ 4th place)

 Ayari Aoyama
 Heat — 1:00.20
 Final — 1:00.18 (→ 6th place)

Women's 200 m Butterfly
 Hitomi Kashima
 Heat — 2:16.04
 B-Final — 2:13.97 (→ 14th place)

 Mika Haruna
 Heat — 2:12.59
 Final — 2:11.93 (→ 7th place)

Women's 200 m Individual Medley
 Fumie Kurotori
 Heat — 2:20.58 (→ did not advance, 28th place)

Women's 400 m Individual Medley
 Fumie Kurotori
 Heat — 4:48.51 
 B-Final — 4:47.98 (→ 12th place)

 Hideko Hiranaka
 Heat — 4:49.32 
 B-Final — 4:48.72 (→ 13th place)

Women's 4 × 100 m Freestyle Relay
 Sumika Minamoto, Naoko Imoto, Eri Yamanoi and Suzu Chiba
 Heat — 3:48.77 (→ did not advance, 12th place)

Women's 4 × 200 m Freestyle Relay
 Eri Yamanoi, Naoko Imoto, Aiko Miyake and Suzu Chiba
 Heat — 8:09.46
 Final — 8:07.46 (→ 4th place)

Women's 4 × 100 m Medley Relay
 Mai Nakamura, Masami Tanaka, Ayari Aoyama and Suzu Chiba
 Heat — 4:10.71 (→ did not advance, 9th place)

Synchronized swimming

Table tennis

Tennis

Men's Singles Competition
 Shuzo Matsuoka
 First round — Lost to Tim Henman (Great Britain) 6-7 3-6

Men's Doubles Competition
 Satoshi Iwabuchi and Takao Suzuki
 First round — Defeated Juan-Carlos Bianchi and Nicolas Pereira (Venezuela) 6-4, 6-7, 8-6
 Second round — Lost to Sergi Bruguera and Tomás Carbonell (Spain) 7-6, 2-6, 5-7

Women's Singles Competition
 Ai Sugiyama
 First round — Defeated Katarina Studenikova (Slovakia) 6-2 6-3
 Second round — Defeated Martina Hingis (Switzerland) 6-4 6-4
 Third round — Lost to Jana Novotná (Czech Republic) 3-6 4-6

 Kimiko Date
 First round — Defeated Dally Randriantefy (Madagascar) 6-0 6-1
 Second round — Defeated Virag Csurgo (Hungary) 6-2 6-3
 Third round — Defeated Magdalena Maleeva (Bulgaria) 6-4 6-4
 Quarter Finals — Lost to Arantxa Sánchez Vicario (Spain) 6-4 3-6 8-10

 Naoko Sawamatsu
 First round — Defeated Sung-Hee Park (South Korea) 6-3 4-6 6-3
 Second round — Lost to Lindsay Davenport (United States) 2-6 2-6

Volleyball

Women's Indoor Team Competition
Preliminary round (group A)
 Lost to South Korea (0-3)
 Defeated Ukraine (3-0)
 Lost to Netherlands (0-3)
 Lost to United States (0-3)
 Lost to China (0-3)
Quarterfinals
 did not advance (→ Ninth place)

Team roster
Kaiyo Hoshini 
Aki Nagatomi
Kazumi Nakamura
Chieko Nakanishi 
Motoko Ohbayashi 
Ikumi Ogake 
Mika Saiki 
Kiyomi Sakamoto 
Asako Tajimi 
Chiho Torii 
Mika Yamauchi 
Tomoko Yoshihara 
Head coach: Kuniaki Yoshida

Weightlifting

Wrestling

Notes

References

Nations at the 1996 Summer Olympics
1996
Summer Olympics